Sher-e-Bangla Nagar (lit. City of the Lion of Bengal) is a neighborhood and a thana of Dhaka, the capital of Bangladesh.  It is also known as the 'capitol within the capital' due to it being the home to the National Parliament and Ganabhaban. The area was named after A. K. Fazlul Huq, a renowned statesman and one of the most prominent political figures of Bangladesh who was popularly known as "Sher-e-Bangla" (Tiger of Bengal). The thana was formed in 2009 from parts of Tejgaon, Kafrul and Mohammadpur thanas. Sher-e-Bangla Nagar is a busy commercial and central neighborhood in the city and home to many offices of government and public institutions, educational institutions, banks and financial institutions and shops.

History

The history of Sher-e-Bangla Nagar can be traced back to before the independence of Bangladesh. Designed by Louis I. Kahn, the complex in Dhaka was designed to make a significant impact locally and internationally and to represent the strong presence of the central government of what was then Pakistan.  from the city center, the project originally consisted of the National Assembly building and three hostels (that is, temporary accommodations for officials and delegates coming from West Pakistan when parliament was in session). One hostel was for ministers, one for secretaries, and one for the delegates to the National Assembly. The assembly and hostels were grouped together and called the "Citadel of the Assembly."

An early version shows some civic functions, called by the architect the "Citadel of the Institutions," grouped opposite the assembly. None of its constituents was ever built and, in 1971, it was replaced by the National Secretariat of Bangladesh. After 1975, the nation became more stable, and the project was revived. The capítol complex was again seen as a symbol; this time of the new government's stability and accomplishments.

Offices and organizations

The Ministry of Defense and Election Commission of Bangladesh are in Sher-e-Bangla Nagar. Furthermore, Asian Development Bank Bangladesh Resident Mission is across from the Local Government Engineering Department (LGED). Sher-e-Bangla Nagar houses the Department of Immigration and Passports, an attached department under the Ministry of Home Affairs of the Government of the People's Republic of Bangladesh.
The National Parliament is located here which is one of the country's prominent aesthetic architectural structures designed by American architect Louis I. Kahn. Bangladesh Institute of Development Studies and Sher-e-Bangla nagar Telephone Exchange Dhaka are here as well. Islamic Development Bank Bangladesh branch is right beside BCS Computer City. The Bangladesh-China Friendship Conference Center, is one of the largest international convention centres in Bangladesh. The Bangladesh-China Friendship Center was built in 2002 at a cost of approximately ৳300 crore (US$56 million) in Sher-e-Bangla Nagar.

Education
One of the country's best agricultural universities, Sher-e-Bangla Agricultural University, is housed in Sher-e-Bangla. Shaheed Suhrawardy Medical College is near the Ministry of Defense. Some well-known schools including Gonobhaban Government High School, Sher-e-Bangla Nagar Government Boys' High School are also housed in Sher-e-Bangla.

Gallery

References

Thanas of Dhaka